Alfredo Mendes (7 November 1910 – 7 November 1995) was a Brazilian athlete. He competed in the men's high jump at the 1936 Summer Olympics.

References

1910 births
1995 deaths
Athletes (track and field) at the 1936 Summer Olympics
Brazilian male high jumpers
Olympic athletes of Brazil
Place of birth missing